Mikhail Vladimirovich Pronichev (born 22 April 1968) is a former Russian football player.

Career
Pronichev was one of the first players from the still existing Soviet Union who went to play in Germany. Pronichev joined FC Berlin in 1990, where he had the opportunity to play a season with the small remainder of the team of BFC Dynamo that was once East German champions. He initially played alongside players such as Christian Backs, Burkhard Reich and Waldemar Ksienzyk. Pronichev scored 13 goals for FC Berlin in the successful 1991-92 NOFV-Oberliga Nord. He was one of the most prominent players of FC Berlin in the mid-1990s, together with midfielder Stefan Oesker and libero Heiko Brestrich. Pronichev suffered a cruciate ligament injury at the start of the 1994-95 Regionaliga Nordost season. He left FC Berlin for TuS Makkabi Berlin in 1997.

Personal
Pronichev is the father of Maximilian Pronichev, who is now a professional footballer.

Honours

FC Lokomotiv Moscow
 Soviet Cup:
 Runners-up: 1989-90

FC Berlin
 NOFV-Oberliga Nord
 Winners: 1991–92

References

External links
 
 

1968 births
Footballers from Moscow
Living people
Soviet footballers
FC Spartak Kostroma players
FC FShM Torpedo Moscow players
FC Asmaral Moscow players
FC Lokomotiv Moscow players
Soviet Top League players
Berliner FC Dynamo players
Soviet expatriate footballers
Expatriate footballers in Germany
Russian footballers
Russian expatriate footballers
FC Spartak Moscow players
Association football forwards
DDR-Oberliga players